Francesco Serini (died 6 September 1598) was a Roman Catholic prelate who served as Bishop of Bagnoregio (1590–1598).

On 16 July 1590, Francesco Serini was appointed during the papacy of Pope Sixtus V as Bishop of Bagnoregio. He served as Bishop of Bagnoregio until his death on 6 September 1598. While bishop, he was the principal co-consecrator of Arnaud d'Ossat, Bishop of Rennes.

References

External links and additional sources
 (for Chronology of Bishops) 
 (for Chronology of Bishops) 

16th-century Italian Roman Catholic bishops
Bishops appointed by Pope Sixtus V
1598 deaths